History of Larimer County, Colorado is a work of history published in 1911 by Ansel Watrous. The book was the first published comprehensive history of Larimer County, Colorado in the United States. It was republished in 1972 by the Cache la Poudre chapter of the Daughters of the American Revolution.

Notes

1911 non-fiction books
Larimer County, Colorado
History of Colorado by county
History of Fort Collins, Colorado